C. fimbriata may refer to:

Caprinia fimbriata, a moth species
Ceratocystis fimbriata, a fungus species
Chelus fimbriata, the mata mata, a turtle species
Choerades fimbriata, a robber fly species
Chorizanthe fimbriata, a flowering plant species
Cladonia fimbriata, a lichen species
Coelogyne fimbriata, an orchid species
Coracina fimbriata, the lesser cuckooshrike, a bird species
Coralliophila fimbriata, a sea snail species
Corythangela fimbriata, a moth species
Crinia fimbriata, the Kimberley froglet, a frog species
Cyclopsetta fimbriata, the spotfin flounder, a flatfish species